Clement Schuyler McCallin (6 March 1913 – 7 August 1977) was a British actor from London. RADA trained, he made his stage debut in 1931, and worked extensively with the RSC and The Old Vic. He was married to actress Brenda Bruce, with whom he adopted a son. He was her second husband, and predeceased her, dying in 1977 in Stratford-upon-Avon, from unknown causes.

Selected filmography
 Stolen Life (1939) - Karal Anderson
 Edward, My Son (1949) - Sergeant Kenyon
 The Queen of Spades (1949) - Officer in the gaming room
 Murder in the Cathedral (1951) - 2nd Priest - prior
 The Rossiter Case (1951) - Peter Rossiter
 The Lady with a Lamp (1951) - Richard M. Milnes
 Cry, the Beloved Country (1951) - First reporter (uncredited)
 The Story of Robin Hood and His Merrie Men (1952) - Earl of Huntingdon
 Folly to Be Wise (1952) - Colonel (uncredited)
 Rough Shoot (1953) - Inspector Sullivan
 Beau Brummell (1954) - Footman (uncredited)
 Happy Deathday (1968) - Prof. Esteban Zoltan

References

External links
 

1913 births
1977 deaths
English male stage actors
English male film actors
Male actors from London
20th-century English male actors
Alumni of RADA